The Ministry of Infrastructure (Swedish: Infrastrukturdepartementet) is a ministry within the government of Sweden responsible for matters regarding transport and infrastructure, digitization, mail and energy.

The ministry will be joint with The Ministry of Rural Affairs on 1 January 2023.

Minister for Rural Affairs Peter Kullgren (KD) is the head of the Ministry of Infrastructure. The Minister for Infrastructure and Housing Andreas Carlson (KD) is also located here.

History 
The Ministry of Infrastructure was formed on April 1, 2019 and took over some responsibilities previously handled by the Ministry of Enterprise and Innovation, the Ministry of Finance and the Ministry of the Environment.

The Ministry of Infrastructure is the successor to the Ministry of Communication, which was abolished on 31 December 1998.

Government agencies 
The Ministry of Infrastructure holds ministerial responsibility for the following government agencies:

 Authority for Digital Management
 Civil Aviation Administration
 Electrical Safety Authority
 Energy Market Inspectorate
 National Road and Transport Research Institute 
 Oil Crisis Board
 State Energy Authority
 Svenska kraftnät
 Swedish Maritime Administration
 Swedish Post and Telecom Authority
 Swedish Transport Administration
 Swedish Transport Agency
 Trafikanalys

References 

Organizations established in 2019
Government ministries of Sweden
Infrastructure ministries